Popi is an American sitcom which aired on CBS from January 20, 1976 to August 24, 1976. The show, which ran for eleven episodes, was adapted from the 1969 film of the same name and was one of the first series on American network television to feature a Latino cast and theme. Popi starred actor Héctor Elizondo as a Puerto Rican widower, and Edith Diaz.

Cast
Héctor Elizondo as Abraham Rodriguez
Edith Diaz as Lupe
Anthony Perez as Junior Rodriguez
Dennis Vasquez as Luis Rodriguez
Lou Criscuolo as Maggio

References

External links
 

CBS original programming
1970s American sitcoms
1976 American television series debuts
1976 American television series endings
Latino sitcoms
Live action television shows based on films
Television shows set in New York City